Vaimasenu'u Zita Sefo-Martel (born 15 July 1961) is a Samoan women's rights activist, fautasi skipper, and archer who has represented Samoa at the Pacific Games. She is also an honorary consul of France.

Biography 
Martel attended Canterbury University, where she had been a rower.

In 2000, her local church needed a skipper for their longboat, or fautasi. At first she refused the request, but was eventually persuaded to give it a try. When she became the skipper for her church, she also became the first woman to act as captain in the fautasi races in 2001. Her boat won the race at Samoa's 50th independence celebrations in 2012. In 2020 her crew won the Faleula to Apia fautasi race.

She represented Samoa in archery at the 2007 Pacific Games in Apia, winning silver (alongside Prime Minister Tuila'epa Sa'ilele Malielegaoi and Eddie Chan Pao) in the mixed recurve matchplay and in the individual compound. At the 2011 Pacific Games in Nouméa she won gold in the compound matchplay and bronze in the compound individual.

Martel also speaks out against domestic violence in Samoa.

Honours
In 2013 Martel was made an officer of the French National Order of Merit.

References

External links 
 Tatau: Marks of Polynesia - Zita Martel (2016 video)
 Samoa 50th Independence ad with Zita Martel (2012 video)
 Zita Martel, First Woman to Captain a Winning Fautasi (2012 video)

Living people
1961 births
University of Canterbury alumni
Samoan activists
Samoan women activists
Officers of the Ordre national du Mérite
Samoan female rowers
Samoan female archers
Women's rights in Samoa